The Alben W. Barkley School of Law (formerly the American Justice School of Law) was a private, for-profit law school founded in 2004 in Paducah, Kentucky.

The school closed on December 31, 2008.

Campus
The Alben W. Barkley School of Law was located in the Paducah Information Age Park Resource Center.

Accreditation
The Alben W. Barkley School of Law was not accredited by the American Bar Association (ABA) although it had sought accreditation. In August 2007, the ABA denied the Barkley School of Law's  (while it was still known as the American Justice School of Law or AJSL) provisional accreditation on its first application.

History

The school's founding dean was Dean Paul M. Hendrick, formerly assistant dean, acting dean, and faculty member of Florida Coastal School of Law. The first class entered in the fall of 2005, consisting of 61 students from 27 states.

Dean Hendrick and Associate Dean Jerrod Turner resigned their positions in February 2008. John Daughaday was appointed the acting Dean and Robert Collins was appointed acting Associate Dean of the law school.  The new owners assumed the debts of American Justice School of Law in the settlement agreement approved by the court.

In March 2008 Deans Daughaday  and Collins resigned.

In March 2008 the American Justice School of Law was renamed the Alben W. Barkley School of Law.

On  Wednesday, October 22, 2008, the owner of the Barkley School of Law, Laxmaiah Manchikanti, released a written statement announcing that the school would close as of December 31, 2008.  The new owners had filed for bankruptcy in September 2008.

Lawsuit
In November 2007, Thomas L. Osborne, the chairman of AJSL's board and attorney for AJSL, resigned. To enhance connectivity with the regional community, AJSL formed a new board of trustees.

Osborne, when he met to discuss corrections with the Board of Directors, refused to respond to questions  from the board members about participants in a meeting he had attended, and left the meeting.

On November 17, 2007, Osborne filed a federal lawsuit on behalf of a minority of the student body and himself as a shareholder of the school.  None of these claims was ever proved in court.  All claims were withdrawn and dismissed in the settlement in which the new owners supported by Osborne agreed to assume the school's existing debts.

These claims were vigorously denied by all of the law school board members, and all of these claims were withdrawn in a settlement agreement agreed to by all parties before any hearings were held in the Federal Court.  Judge Russell incorporated the settlement agreement in his order dismissing the case.

According to Dean Hendrick's statement to the Paducah Sun, the lawsuit boiled down to an attempted hostile takeover of the law school. The new owners assumed the debts of the school.

Thirty of a total 185 students chose to join the suit against Hendrick, Turner, and Shelton.  All claims in the complaint were withdrawn in the settlement agreement and the suit was dismissed by the Court.  The majority of law school shares were transferred in the settlement to a local physician, Dr. Laxmaiah Manchikanti.

Curriculum

The Alben W. Barkley School of Law required students to complete work in one of its law clinics or take practice skills courses before graduation.

References

Law schools in Kentucky
Educational institutions established in 2004
Educational institutions disestablished in 2008
Defunct private universities and colleges in Kentucky
2004 establishments in Kentucky
2008 disestablishments in Kentucky
Defunct law schools
For-profit universities and colleges in the United States